Liu Qiao (born c. 1970) is a Chinese economist. He is the dean of the Guanghua School of Management of Peking University, where he is also a professor of finance.

Early life
Liu was born circa 1970. He graduated from the Renmin University of China, where he earned a bachelor's degree in economics and mathematics in 1991. He earned a master's degree in international finance and economics from the Tsinghua University in 1994, and a PhD in economics from the University of California, Los Angeles in 2000.

Career
Liu worked for McKinsey & Company from 2001 to 2003.

Liu was an assistant professor of economics at the University of Hong Kong from 2003 to 2010. He became a professor of finance at Peking University's Guanghua School of Management in 2011. He serves as its dean.

Liu serves on the boards of directors of ZH International Holdings and Hexie Health Insurance.

Works

References

Living people
Renmin University of China alumni
Tsinghua University alumni
University of California, Los Angeles alumni
Academic staff of the University of Hong Kong
Academic staff of Peking University
Business school deans
Chinese corporate directors
People's Republic of China economists
Chinese academic administrators
Year of birth missing (living people)